The 1998 Speedway World Team Cup was the 39th edition of the FIM Speedway World Team Cup to determine the team world champions.

The final took place on 11 September at the Vojens Speedway Center in Denmark. The winners were the United States team who claimed their fifth title.

Qualification

Group B

 June 7, 1998
  Daugavpils

 Latvia and Ukraine to Group A

Group A

 June 28, 1998
  Togliatti

Draw 1.  -> 

 Czech Republic and Hungary to Final

World Final
 September 11, 1998
  Vojens, Speedway Center

See also
 1998 Speedway Grand Prix

References

1998
World T